Daylight Division is an American rock band formed in 2009. The group consists of members from P.O.D., Papa Roach, and Chevelle.

History
Marcos Curiel (P.O.D.) and Dave Buckner (Papa Roach) were introduced to each other by a mutual friend and Marcos then invited Joe Loeffler (Chevelle), a longtime friend, to join. The band's original singer was Lukas Rossi (of Rock Star Supernova fame), who joined in June 2009, but parted ways with the band shortly thereafter. The band took part in charity concerts supporting Chi of Deftones, along with Lit, P.O.D., The Letter Black and many more. Failing to find a permanent lead vocalist, Daylight Division ended in 2011. In 2012 it was announced that Dave Buckner and Lukas Rossi joined forces again to form The Halo Method with Ben Moody of Evanescence and Josh Newell of In This Moment.

Band members
Current members
 Marcos Curiel - guitar
 Joe Loeffler - bass
 Dave Buckner - drums

Former members
 Lukas Rossi - vocals

References

American alternative rock groups
Musical groups established in 2009